WBEC-TV (channel 63) is an educational television station owned and operated by Broward County Public Schools, licensed to Boca Raton, Florida, United States. WBEC-TV broadcasts from studios in Davie and a transmitter in Pembroke Park; the school district also owns WKPX (88.5 FM), a non-commercial radio station. Although the station is based in Broward County, WBEC-TV's city of license, Boca Raton, is located within Palm Beach County.

History
Instructional television in the Broward County school system dates to the establishment of a system to send programming among the Broward County schools using Title I funds. The first program was broadcast January 29, 1968. By 1977, it was distributing 80 series—internally and externally produced—throughout the school system and selling some of its own productions nationally to other school districts. This came in spite of a stretch earlier in the decade in which instructional television was faced with four budget cuts in as many years. The number of series offered had risen to 130 by 1980. However, changes were made to the ITV system in 1988 in response to a task force report that found it underused, particularly in the middle and high schools where broadcasts of programming from the ITV center did not correspond with class schedules. It also began to add student-produced programming to its lineup. Some ITV programs were also broadcast on local cable. One example was the ITV Homework Hotline, a weekly call-in show allowing students to ask a teacher questions about math problems. The service changed its name to Broward Education Communications Network (BECON) in 1998.

Meanwhile, the channel 63 construction permit was issued in the late 1980s to Palmetto Broadcasters Associated for Communities and was slated to launch as WPPB-TV, the "Second Season" station, with programming aimed at senior citizens; Palmetto Broadcasters Associated for Communities was affiliated with Palm Beach Atlantic College. PBAC had ambitious broadcasting plans; at the same time it revealed information on the forthcoming WPPB-TV, it announced WTCE-TV (channel 21) in Fort Pierce, which it mostly built but ran out of money to start, alongside a station on channel 9 in Islamorada that would be known as "Hispanivision" (and was never built).

Palmetto Broadcasters did not build the channel, and in 1999, with the construction permit still unbuilt, channel 63 was sold to The Christian Network for $300,000 and finally launched that same year with Christian programming. The Christian Network promptly sold the station to the Broward County school board for $3.6 million in January 2000. With broadcast and cable coverage, the station adopted a format of educational and community programming. On March 15, 2008, the station changed its call letters to WBEC-TV.

In 2019, an outside audit of BECON recommended augmenting its output of school board meetings and educational programming. It noted that equipment and job descriptions were aging, fundraising was weak, and that the primary way the district made revenue with BECON was leasing broadband spectrum. The audit also noted that, of seven full-service TV stations owned by school boards in the United States, WBEC-TV was the only one not part of PBS.

Technical information

Subchannels
WBEC-TV offers one program stream in high definition and standard definition.

Analog-to-digital conversion
WBEC-TV shut down its analog signal, over UHF channel 63, on June 12, 2009, the official date in which full-power television stations in the United States transitioned from analog to digital broadcasts under federal mandate. The station's digital signal continued to broadcast on its pre-transition UHF channel 40, using virtual channel 63.

References

External links 
Official website

Educational and instructional television channels
Television channels and stations established in 1999
Broward County Public Schools
BEC-TV
1999 establishments in Florida